Bukit Pinang is a mukim in Kota Setar District, Kedah, Malaysia. It was once the seat of the Sultanate of Kedah and its annexed territories. Bukit Pinang is also the current name for the State of Kedah Legislative Assembly seat which is also located in the Parliamentary seat of Pokok Sena.

Name
The name Bukit Pinang was derived from the numerous betel trees (pokok pinang) which grew at the surroundings of the hill.

History
Bukit Pinang was the capital of Kedah before it was moved to Alor Setar in the year 1735 by His Majesty Sultan Muhammad Jiwa Zainal Adilin Mu'adzam Shah II (1710–1778)

Geography
Bukit Pinang spreads across 11 km2 of land and has a population of 8,616 people.

Kota Setar District
Mukims of Kedah